Kris Blanks (born November 3, 1972) is an American professional golfer who currently plays on the PGA Tour and previously played on the Nationwide Tour.

Blanks was born in Warner Robins, Georgia. He attended Huntingdon College.

Blanks played on the Nationwide Tour in 2005, 2007, and 2008. His best finish was a win at the 2008 Bank of America Open. In 2008, he finished 13th on the Nationwide Tour Money List and thus earned his PGA Tour card for 2009 for finishing in the top 25.

He has played on the PGA Tour since 2009. He finished in second place at the 2010 Puerto Rico Open. In 2011, he finished the RBC Canadian Open in a tie with Sean O'Hair and went on to lose the sudden death playoff to finish second.

Blanks was arrested on June 30, 2013 after he attempted to carry a gun on board a plane at Palm Beach International Airport. The charges were later dropped.

In March 2014, Blanks won his second event on the Web.com Tour with a sudden death playoff victory at the Chitimacha Louisiana Open over Brett Stegmaier.

Professional wins (2)

Web.com Tour wins (2)

Web.com Tour playoff record (1–0)

Playoff record
PGA Tour playoff record (0–1)

Results in major championships

CUT = missed the half-way cut

See also
2008 Nationwide Tour graduates
2009 PGA Tour Qualifying School graduates
2012 PGA Tour Qualifying School graduates

References

External links

American male golfers
PGA Tour golfers
Korn Ferry Tour graduates
Golfers from Georgia (U.S. state)
Golfers from Florida
Huntingdon Hawks athletes
People from Warner Robins, Georgia
People from Jupiter, Florida
1972 births
Living people